Antonio Perugino (born 30 September 1973) is an Italian boxer. He competed in the men's light middleweight event at the 1996 Summer Olympics.

References

External links
 

1973 births
Living people
Italian male boxers
Olympic boxers of Italy
Boxers at the 1996 Summer Olympics
Sportspeople from the Province of Caserta
Light-middleweight boxers
20th-century Italian people